The 2nd Space Warning Squadron Is part of the Space Delta 4 at Buckley Space Force Base, Colorado.  It operates the Space-Based Infrared System satellites conducting global monitoring for significant infrared events.

The squadron's mission is to operate and maintain the Space-Based Infrared System.  Additionally, it reports ballistic missile and space launches, nuclear detonations, and infrared data of operational value to the President of the United States, Secretary of Defense, combatant commanders, intelligence agencies, and global warfighters.

Operations 
On 7 January 2020 2nd Space Warning Squadron detected the launches of more than a dozen missiles against US and coalition partners. This provided crucial warning to the warfighters, which helped them to take cover.

History
The squadron has operated ground stations set up to control the Defense Support Program (DSP) and Space-Based Infrared System, space-based surveillance systems configured to detect and report ballistic missile launches, space launches, and nuclear detonations since 1992.

Lineage
 Constituted as the 2d Space Communications Squadron on 1 May 1992
 Activated on 15 May 1992
 Redesignated 2d Space Warning Squadron on 1 May 1993

Assignments
 21st Operations Group, 15 May 1992
 21st Space Wing, 21 July 1995
 460th Operations Group, unknown – present

Stations
 Buckley Air National Guard Base (now Buckley Space Force Base), Colorado, 15 May 1992 – present

Systems Operated
 Space-Based Infrared System satellites (200x-present)
 Defense Support Program satellites (1992–present)

List of commanders

 Lt Col Francois Roy, July 2013
 Lt Col April Wimmer, 7 July 2015
Lt Col Shannon DaSilva, 11 May 2017
 Lt Col Brandon Davenport, 5 June 2019
 Lt Col Michael Mariner, 1 July 2021

References

Bibliography

External links
460th Operations Group Fact Sheet

Squadrons of the United States Space Force
Military units and formations in Colorado